Samorn Kieng (born 4 March 1983 in Kandal Province) is a Cambodian middle-distance runner. He competed in the men's 800 m event at the 2012 Summer Olympics but was eliminated in the first round. However, Kieng did finish with a season's best time of 1:55.26.

Kieng took part in the 2012 IAAF World Indoor Championships where he broke the national record with a time of 1:59.14 even though Kieng was eliminated in the first round. He also ran in the heats of the event at the 2013 World Championships in Athletics.

References

samorn

External links
 

Living people
1983 births
People from Kandal province
Olympic athletes of Cambodia
Cambodian male middle-distance runners
Athletes (track and field) at the 2012 Summer Olympics
World Athletics Championships athletes for Cambodia